Teresa Kok Suh Sim (Pha̍k-fa-sṳ: Kwo̍k Su-tshim; born 31 March 1964) is a Malaysian politician who served as the Minister of Primary Industries in the Pakatan Harapan (PH) administration under former Prime Minister Mahathir Mohamad from July 2018 to the collapse of the PH administration in February 2020. She has served as the Member of Parliament (MP) for Seputeh since November 1999. She also served as the Selangor State Executive Councillor and Member of the Selangor State Legislative Assembly (MLA) for Kinrara from March 2008 to May 2013. She is a member of the Democratic Action Party (DAP), a component party of the PH opposition coalition.

Early life and education
Born and raised in Kuala Lumpur, Teresa is a third generation Malaysian of Chinese descent. Kok is a member of the Hakka dialect group and her ancestors were from Huizhou, Guangdong Province, China. She commands Malay, English and Chinese Languages with fluency in Hakka and Cantonese dialects. Kok is a Catholic by religion.

She graduated with a Bachelor of Communication from Universiti Sains Malaysia (USM) in 1990, and obtained a Master of Philosophy from University of Malaya. Her thesis was on United Malays National Organization (UMNO), titled "Factionalism in Umno During Dr Mahathir's Era (1981–2001)".

Kok writes in weekly column for Chinese newspaper Sin Chew Daily. In 2004, she published a book compiling articles she wrote for the then Chinese daily.

Political career
Kok was political secretary to Opposition Leader Lim Kit Siang from 1990 to 1995.
In 1995 general election, she contested the Ipoh Barat Parliamentary seat on a DAP ticket but was defeated by the Malaysian Chinese Association (MCA) candidate. Kok resigned as political secretary after that to further her studies and worked part-time at  the Secretariat of the Political Leaders Network Promoting Democracy in Burma (PD Burma) from 1996 till 1998.

In the 1999 general election, Kok won the Parliamentary seat of Seputeh in Kuala Lumpur with a majority of 5,200 and was re-elected in 2004 with a majority of 12,895, the largest winning margin among the 13 elected DAP MPs.

In the 2008 general election, Kok retained the Seputeh seat with a majority of 36,492, the largest majority in any constituency and won the Kinrara seat in Selangor State Legislative Assembly at the same time. She was elected in the new Selangor State Executive Council, and was named senior executive councillor who was put in charge of investment, trade and industry to ensure all funds are directed to Malaysians.

In 2013 general election, she won re-election to Parliament, garnering over 86 percent of the formal votes cast in her Seputeh constituency.

Kok was re-elected to Seputeh seat for the fifth term in the 2018 general election but on the ticket of People's Justice Party (PKR) as the move of Pakatan Harapan using a common symbol in the election.

In view of the bad market of palm oil, she launches few palm oil drinking campaign to boost the market demand on the palm oil and further inviting local tour guide to become the ambassadors for palm oil.

Controversy

Advise mosque to not use speaker 
In 2008, she was arrested under the Internal Security Act (ISA). Under the act, the police have no obligation to disclose the alleged offence if any at all. The Malay newspaper Utusan Malaysia had reported she had "advised" a mosque in Puchong not to use loudspeakers while making the azan. She denied the allegation. It was found out later that a faulty loudspeaker system was the reason why the mosque did not broadcast the azan. Furthermore, while there was a petition sent to the mosque, the petition requested for the mosque to lower the volume during 'ceramah' or sermons and not during the azan. The administrator of the mosque, as well as the petitioners, confirmed that Kok was not involved in the petition. She was released on 19 September 2008. On 27 September, two Molotov cocktails were thrown into the compound of her family residence, accompanied by a warning letter. No one was hurt.

Seditious speech 
In May 2014, Kok was charged with sedition for making a Chinese New Year video posted on YouTube which allegedly contained seditious elements. Kok was among the first of several other opposition politicians to be caught in a nationwide sedition dragnet.

Threat on police 
On 26 February 2022, during a speech for the 2022 Johor state election, Kok asked the police to allow them to speak for 30 more minutes. Due to the Covid-19 restrictions, speeches in the electoral campaign can only be 2 hours. Kok stated that they started the speech late at 8:30pm, so they should have 2 hours till 10:30pm, but the police in charge of the speech rejected her request. After that, she said that if Pakatan Harapan is the government, they won't set such restrictions and "warned" the police to be careful. On 2 March 2022, she stated that the MCA dinner nearby had disrupted them, therefore making them starting the speech 30 minutes later Also, she stated that the police refused them to extend the speech for 30 minutes as they are the opposition.

Palm oil activism
Despite the criticism from activists back home, Teresa Kok kept up with her palm oil activism despite narrow scares at the ballot box. The palm oil industry reciprocated her support by providing indirect campaign support and this drew further brickbats from critics. She admonished member states of the Association of Southeast Asian Nations (ASEAN), should support one another against outside threats to an industry as important to the region as palm oil. Teresa Kok also opposed World Health Organization (WHO) advice to adult to avoid palm oil in their diet during the Covid-19 outbreak and use alternatives such as olive oil.

Election results

References

Others
 Kok, Teresa (2002). "Government Should Not Send The Rohingya Refugees Who Broke Into The UNHCR Office Back To Burma". Retrieved 5 November 2005.
 Kok, Teresa (2005). "Teresa Kok Suh Sim". Retrieved 29 October 2005.

External links

 Teresa Kok's blog.
 Teresa Kok's Parliamentary Web Page

1964 births
Living people
People from Selangor
People from Huizhou
Malaysian people of Hakka descent
Malaysian politicians of Chinese descent
Malaysian Roman Catholics
Malaysian prisoners and detainees
Women members of the Dewan Rakyat
Members of the Dewan Rakyat
Government ministers of Malaysia
Women government ministers of Malaysia
Women in Kuala Lumpur politics
Women MLAs in Selangor
Members of the Selangor State Legislative Assembly
Selangor state executive councillors
Democratic Action Party (Malaysia) politicians
University of Malaya alumni
Universiti Sains Malaysia alumni
21st-century Malaysian politicians
21st-century Malaysian women politicians